Reginald Albert Saltmarsh, known by the stage name Reginald Marsh (17 September 1926 – 9 February 2001), was an English actor who is best remembered for supporting roles in many British sitcoms from the 1970s onwards.

Early life and career
Marsh was born in London in 1926 and he grew up on the Sussex coast at Worthing. After he left school he worked in a bank. After realising how serious he was about acting, his father introduced him to a retired actress, who introduced him to an agent who got his first acting role, at the age of 16, as a juvenile in Eden End by J.B. Priestley. He then worked in rep.

In 1958, he started working behind the scenes of Granada Television, but he soon went back to acting. From the 1960s he appeared in many films, including The Day the Earth Caught Fire (1961), Jigsaw (1962), Berserk! (1967), The Ragman's Daughter (1972), Young Winston (1972) and The Best Pair of Legs in the Business (1973), and on television, in such series as Dixon of Dock Green, Z-Cars and The Persuaders!. He also played bookie Dave Smith in Coronation Street on and off from 1962 to 1976.

Marsh played works general manager Arthur Sugden in the boardroom drama The Plane Makers (1963–64). He also appeared in The Champions (1968), Hine (1971), The Stone Tape (1972), Emmerdale Farm (1973), Crown Court (1973–74), QB VII (1974), Bless This House (1974), The Sweeney (1975), and The Duchess of Duke Street (1976). From 1975, Marsh played Jerry Leadbetter's boss in several episodes of The Good Life. He played a similar role in George and Mildred from 1976 to 1979, as Humphrey Pumphrey, Mildred's brother-in-law. From 1979 to 1987, Marsh played another similar role, Sir Dennis Hodge, Terry's boss, in Terry and June later reuniting with June Whitfield in the 1992 sitcom Terry and Julian, where he played Terry's boss George Wilson. From 1981 to 1985, Marsh played Reg Lamont in the soap opera Crossroads.

His play The Death is Announced ("A Murder Play") was produced in Leeds in 1964. He played Inspector Cullen. He described the play as a "comedy who-dun-it" and said that he wrote it "because he could never find a good 'copper' part for himself."

Later life
In the 1980s and 1990s, Marsh had many small roles on television, including appearing in Only When I Laugh, Home to Roost, Bergerac, Boon, Minder, Alleyn Mysteries and Terry and June. One of his last television roles was in an episode of Paul Merton in Galton & Simpson's... aired on 14 October 1997.

Reginald Marsh was married to actress Rosemary Murray, and they had four children. Marsh had two other children by his first marriage, actress Jenifer Coverdale. One of his sons had Down’s Syndrome, and during his retirement on the Isle of Wight Reginald Marsh actively supported MENCAP. He died at his home on 9 February 2001 in Ryde aged 74.

Filmography

References

External links

1926 births
2001 deaths
English male film actors
English male stage actors
English male television actors
People from Worthing
20th-century English male actors
Male actors from London